Michael Jez (born 7 June 1954) is a former Australian rules footballer who played with Carlton in the Victorian Football League (VFL).

Notes

External links 

Michael Jez's profile at Blueseum

1954 births
Carlton Football Club players
East Fremantle Football Club players
Australian rules footballers from Western Australia
Living people